Dar Gai is an India-based Ukrainian director, screenwriter and producer. She is best known for her work on the films Teen Aur Aadha and Namdev Bhau: In Search of Silence. Gai has also directed popular videos by Indian artists like Prateek kuhad (Cold mess) and Ritviz (Liggi). She was credited as intimacy director for the movie Gehraiyaan starring Bollywood actors Deepika Padukone, Ananya Pandey and Siddhant Chaturvedi.

Early life
Dar was born in Kyiv, Ukraine. She holds a BFA and MFA degrees in Philosophy with a minor in film and theatre from the NaUKMA. Later, she was invited to India to direct theatre plays at the Scindia School, in Gwalior. She also taught screenwriting and film appreciation in Whistling Woods International Institute, in Mumbai.

Filmography

References

External links
 

Living people
Ukrainian women film directors
Film people from Kyiv
National University of Kyiv-Mohyla Academy alumni
Year of birth missing (living people)